Mikoláš Chadima (born 9 September 1952 in Cheb) is a Czech musician and composer.

Besides singing he plays saxophone, guitar, flute and harmonica. His early bands include The Three Fellows, Purple Fleas, Petroleum Company, Yellow Defect, Inrou and Elektrobus. In 1976, he joined JJ Neduha's band Extempore. He became a leader of the band after Neduha's leaving two years later. He founded his own band MCH Band in 1982. He also collaborated with Pavel Fajt and Mňága a Žďorp. In 1985, he wrote a book called Alternativa which was originally published in samizdat.

In 1979, he signed Charter 77.

His father Jiří Chadima (1923) is a painter.

References

External links 

1952 births
Living people
Czech guitarists
Male guitarists
Czech saxophonists
21st-century Czech male singers
People from Cheb
20th-century saxophonists
Charter 77 signatories
Czech male composers
Czech composers
20th-century Czech male singers
Czechoslovak male singers